Seyed Amir Parvin Hosseini is an Iranian filmmaker and film producer.

He started his career by editing and directing a few music videos and television series. In the following years, his work focused on producing films and series outside of Iran, such as France, China, Turkey, and Brazil. His outstanding productions  have brought him several awards from festivals such as "Asia Best Producer", "International Filmmaker of Peace", "Best Foreign Producer", and others. In 2016 he produced a movie called "I Am Not Salvador" for cinema theater and it became the best seller movie in Iran. He also repeated this experience with “Wing Mirror” movie in 2018. The most significant factor contributing to the success of his works is the estimation and analyzing the market before it was produced.

Filmography

 Time To Change (Tempo Di Cambiare -2018)
 Made in Iran Season 2  (Sakhte Iran2 - 2018)
  Don't Be Embarrassed  (2018)
  Wing Mirror  (2017)
  ZAPAS (2016)
  I Am Not Salvador  (2015)
  Soil and Coral (Khako Marjan - 2013)
 Made in Iran (Sakhte Iran - 2011)
 Mind Your Manners (Akhlagheto Khoob Kon - 2010)
 Rich and Poor (TV series) (Dara va Nadar 2010)
 Do Not Turn, Please (Lotfan Dor Nazanim - 2009)

Awards
Rising Star Award Don't Be Embarrassed, Canada International Film Festival (2019)
Best short film for Time To Change, Aprilia film festival (2019)
Best short film for Time To Change, Corteggiando vimondrona film festival (2019)
Best First Film Don't Be Embarrassed (Khejalat nakesh), Fajr Film Festival (2018)
Best Producer in Asia for Zapas, Asia Rainbow TV Awards (2016)
Best Foreign Feature Producer for Zapas, Hollywood Boulevard Film Festival (2016)
Best Feature Film for Zapas, Canadian Diversity Film Festival (2016)
Best Producer for Made In Iran, Jasmin International Film Festival (2016)
Award of Excellence Filmmaker of Peace for Soil and Coral, International Film Festival for Peace, Inspiration and Equality (2013)
Best Producer for Do Not Turn Please, JameJam Film Festival (2008)

References

External links
 

Alborz High School alumni
Iranian film producers
Living people
People from Tehran
Year of birth missing (living people)